The men's time trial class C2 road cycling event at the 2020 Summer Paralympics took place on 31 August 2021 at the Fuji Speedway, Japan. 14 riders all from different nations competed in this event.

The C2 classification is for cyclists with moderate hemiplegic or diplegic spasticity; moderate athetosis or ataxia; unilateral above knee amputation, etcetera.

Results
The event took place on 31 August 2021, at 8:00:

References

Men's road time trial C2